Hard Workin' Man is the second studio album by American country music duo Brooks & Dunn. Like its predecessor, Brand New Man, the album had a string of top 5 hits on the US Hot Country chart. Its singles were "Hard Workin' Man" (#4), "Rock My World (Little Country Girl)" (#2), "She Used To Be Mine" (#1), "We'll Burn That Bridge" (#2), and "That Ain't No Way To Go" (#1). The album also featured a remixed dance version of the country number-one hit "Boot Scootin' Boogie", from the previous album.

Track listing

Chart performance

Weekly charts

Year-end charts

Certifications

Personnel
Brooks & Dunn
Kix Brooks – lead vocals on tracks 3, 6, 8, 10 and backing vocals
Ronnie Dunn – lead vocals on tracks 1, 2, 4, 5, 7, 9 and backing vocals

Additional musicians
Arista Tabernacle Choir – choir
Bruce Bouton – pedal steel guitar
Mark Casstevens - acoustic guitar, mandolin
Jimmy Gunn – cabasa
Rob Hajacos – fiddle
Terry McMillan – harmonica
Scott Hendricks – cowbell
John Barlow Jarvis – piano, organ
Bill LaBounty – background vocals
Dan McBride – electric guitar
Brent Mason – electric guitar
Jim Messina – backing vocals on "Mexican Minutes"
Danny Parks – acoustic guitar
John Wesley Ryles – backing vocals
Harry Stinson – backing vocals
Dennis Wilson – backing vocals
Lonnie Wilson – drums
Glenn Worf – bass guitar

References

1993 albums
Brooks & Dunn albums
Arista Records albums
Albums produced by Don Cook
Albums produced by Scott Hendricks